Be My Guest is an television programme produced by Television Broadcasts Limited in Hong Kong. It is originally broadcast on TVB Lifestyle Channel of TVB Pay Vision in 2006. It is also aired on certain Cathay Pacific flights. TVB released the VCD, DVD, and books. Stephen Chan Chi Wan, General Manager of TVB, is the host of this show and he interviews notable performing celebrities, politicians, business people in Hong Kong. There are also stage and ball shows of the programme but they are not released.

Format
The Chinese name of the show means that the host and the guest chat, while eating at a restaurant. The venue of the interview is different every time based on the choice of the interviewer. The food are usually featured as a quick interruption between the conversations. Many of the episodes feature fusion cuisine.

List of episodes

Year 2006

Year 2007

Year 2008

Year 2009

Year 2010

References

External links
 Official Website (Chinese)

TVB original programming